Sainte-Marie-Outre-l'Eau is a commune in the Calvados department in the Normandy region in northwestern France. The name roughly translates as Saint Mary beyond the Water.

Geography
The village is located approximately 1 kilometre east from Pont-Farcy, on the left bank of the river Vire. The village is a collection of farm houses and a church. The overall population is 85 (in 2008), including outlying farms. Other nearby communes include Pont-Bellanger and Beaumesnil. The nearest large towns are Villedieu-les-Poeles and Vire.

The village is located close to the Calvados tourist attraction Grotte de Bion

Population

See also
Communes of the Calvados department

References

Communes of Calvados (department)
Calvados communes articles needing translation from French Wikipedia